The 1933–34 Scottish Division One season was won by Rangers by four points over nearest rival Motherwell. Third Lanark and Cowdenbeath finished 19th and 20th respectively and were relegated to the 1934–35 Scottish Division Two.

League table

Results

References

Scottish Football Archive

1933–34 Scottish Football League
Scottish Division One seasons
Scot